The Santa Cruz Surf was an American soccer team based in Santa Cruz, California that played in the USISL.

Year-by-year

Defunct soccer clubs in California
USISL teams
1993 establishments in California
1994 disestablishments in California
Association football clubs established in 1993
Association football clubs disestablished in 1994
Sports in Santa Cruz County, California